Forensic nursing is defined as the application of the nursing process to public or legal proceedings, and the application of forensic health care in the scientific investigation of trauma and/or death related to abuse, violence, criminal activity, liability, and accidents.

Before there was a specialty recognized as forensic nursing, the term used was clinical forensic medicine. This term describes the use of clinical practices to support judicial proceedings to protect a victim, usually after death has occurred. It was not until the late 20th century that medical professionals wanted more collaboration between the medical and legal systems. In the United States this problem began to be addressed.  A strong advocate for the forensic nursing specialty in United States was Virginia Lynch. She pushed to have the specialty recognized and helped to form programs in the U.S. for proper education.  In the 1980s articles were being written about how the important evidence needed to build a legal case was not being preserved during the treatment of a victim. From there began an explanation of the nurse's role in not just forensic medicine but also the criminal justice system when dealing with a victim of violence.

Most nurses practice with the holistic framework of body, mind and spirit.  With forensic nursing established, the role of a nurse was altered to also include the law.  There has been an establishment of this specialty but it was not created to have nurses become investigators. Their goal is to work with a possible victim and make sure the proper medical but also forensic tasks are accomplished. The forensic evidence is then passed on to the criminal justice system for proper investigation.  This specialty has started to be recognized worldwide and is helping to promote an international focus on violence. The nurses are becoming vital resources for the healthy relationship needed between the health and justice systems.

History
Forensic nursing developed in response to concerns in the 1980s regarding the treatment of patients with crime-related injuries and the proper handling of evidence. Globally, the development of general clinical forensic medicine and the forensic nursing have progressed at different speeds, with one preceding the other on a country-by-country basis. Founded in 1992, the International Association of Forensic Nurses is the primary professional association for forensic nursing, which as of 2019 included 4,400 members in 25 countries.

Although forensic nursing can be traced back to the 1980s for the development of the specialty, it can be noted that the foundation may have been laid as early as the 18th century. Certain medical professionals were involved in court cases that involved crimes like rape. These medical professionals began to move these issues from a simply criminal justice view to a more recognized health concern.

Role and responsibilities
Forensic nursing combines nursing practice and forensics in the scientific investigation of death and injury resulting from criminal activity and accidents.  In addition to providing care, forensic nurses act as multidisciplinary team members with and consultants to other nursing and medical professionals and law enforcement.  They receive advanced training in collecting and preserving evidence, treatment protocols, and legal proceedings and testimony.

The specialized training that forensic nurses receive related to both the medical and legal needs of these patients drives demand for the specialty. Crime victims face a higher risk of post-traumatic stress disorder, depression, suicide, and medical complications than other patients; forensic nurses improve both legal outcomes and quality of life for these patients relative to standard Emergency Department care. Forensic nurses also assist in providing professional insight to potential causes of patient injuries in situations in which witnesses are unavailable.

Prior to beginning an exam, forensic nurses must receive consent from the patient. In addition to documenting obvious injuries, forensic nurses specialize in looking for subtle signs of assault, such as petechiae, voice changes, and loss of bowel or bladder function. Forensic nurses document patient injuries through tools including cameras, measuring tapes, fluid swabs, rape kits, and a high-powered light that can reveal hard-to-see bruises and fluids like semen, urine, or saliva. They document every injury for potential use as evidence in a later court case, where they may be called as an expert witness to testify to the injuries.

Forensic nurses are also responsible for educating a patient on his or her rights. In the United States, for example, patients are not required to pursue legal action to receive a medical exam, and it is the forensic nurse's responsibility to discuss this with each patient.

More specifically, forensic nurses go through training to be able to understand and treat different types of trauma that is experienced by many different types of people.

Child abuse 
Child abuse is a common type of trauma that forensic nurses work with.

When these nurses encounter a possible situation involving child abuse they must make sure to protect the child from any more trauma. The forensic nurses look at things such as bruises, possible head injuries and sexual abuse. The importance of a nurse here is key to determine the difference between an inflicted bruise or a usual activity bruise. A forensic nurse will know that a bruise located on the ears, neck and other soft tissues of the body should raise a red flag. Once the physical marks are assessed for abuse or an accident a nurse can decide what to do next, whether that is more tests or a consultation with the physician. When working with children it is important that the nurse makes the child comfortable to ensure a trusting relationship. Forensic Nurses make sure to build this relationship to allow the child to share details they otherwise might keep to themselves. There may be abuse that is not visible to the eye and it is important to make sure the child shares those key details. If abuse is detected the nurse will take the next step of reporting the abuse. Although many policies are similar, each state in the U.S. has its own laws and systems in place for reporting possible child abuse. This is where forensic nursing connects to the legal side of investigation. The nurse must make sure to report their findings, and report them accurately because the nurse is held liable.

Sexual assault 
Another type of trauma that forensic nurses provide care for is sexual assault which includes rape. Forensic nurses are trained to screen for sexual assault because many assaults go unreported. Patients may have some fear, embarrassment, or denial that could inhibit their willingness to report their assault. These nurses have the ability to know whom to screen, and how. Questions are essential to these nurses because not all potential victims are going to be honest about what they may have or may have not experienced. The questions asked need to be worded properly to avoid discomfort and inaccurate information. Recently, there has been an integration of written and verbal questionaries' that may help the patient and the nurse address a possible assault. A possible question to begin would involve asking if the possible victim was forced to do something that he or she did not want to do. It is important that the nurse is able to help a possible victim understand the question without forcing or leading an inaccurate answer. If a patient admits to being sexually assaulted then the next step is to ensure patient safety. There are protocols in place that help a forensic nurse in taking the next step, when a patient admits to being sexually assaulted.  For example, the nurse may explain to the victim their legal rights in regard to reporting the assault, as well as the details of the physical exam for evidence. A specialty in forensic nursing is a Sexual Assault Nurse Examiner (SANE). These nurses will collect and record the forensic evidence needed for a criminal case.  Some of the evidence included should be a history of the incident, removal of clothing, head-to-toe assessment, urine collection, blood draw, oral swabs, genital exams, and a STD screening. After there has been an evidence collection or not (if the patient does not want the assault reported if over 18) follow-up care is essential. The forensic nurse should be able to provide the victim with necessary resources.  These resources may include crisis centers, therapy referrals, and support group information.

Professions
Forensic nursing includes roles such as:
 Clinical forensic nurse
 Forensic nurse investigator
 Forensic nurse examiner
 Forensic correctional or institutional nurse
 Legal nurse consultant
 Nurse attorney
 Nurse coroner

Certification
, the International Association of Forensic Nurses offers two professional certifications under its certification body, the Commission for Forensic Nursing Certification (CFNC), for Sexual Assault Nurse Examiners: the Sexual Assault Nurse Examiner - Adult/Adolescent (SANE-A) and the Sexual Assault Nurse Examiner - Pediatric (SANE-P).

Worldwide

United States
Virginia Lynch, an early advocate of forensic nursing, proposed creation of the forensic nursing specialty in 1986 and helped establish the first graduate studies program at the University of Texas at Arlington's School of Nursing. The American Academy of Forensic Sciences recognized the forensic nursing specialty in 1991 and the American Nurses Association followed in 1995.

Great Britain
In Great Britain, forensic nursing includes a forensic psychiatric nursing sub-specialty, which emphasizes practicing forensic nursing for mental health patients.

Canada
As of June 2015, forensic nursing is not recognized as a nursing specialty in Canada and does not have a PhD program.

See also
 Psychiatric and mental health nursing
 Forensic Psychology
 Forensic Psychiatry
 Legal nurse consultant

References

External links
International Association of Forensic Nurses

Nursing specialties